Pop FM is a Bosnian local commercial radio station, broadcasting from Banja Luka, Bosnia and Herzegovina. This radio station broadcasts a variety of programs such as music and local news. The owner of the radio station is the company Nezavisne novine.

Under this name, Pop FM was launched on 23 July 2018 when local radio station Nes Castra (2007–2018) was rebranded. Sister radio station is near-national radio in Bosnia and Herzegovina, Nes Radio.

Estimated number of listeners of Pop FM is around 159.666.

The program is mainly produced in Serbian, 24 hours a day, and it is available in the territory of the City of Banja Luka, and parts of the municipality of Čelinac, Kotor Varoš in stereo with RDS.

Frequencies 
 Banja Luka

See also 
 List of radio stations in Bosnia and Herzegovina
 Nes Radio

References

External links 
 www.popfm.ba
 www.nezavisne.com
 www.fmscan.org
 Communications Regulatory Agency of Bosnia and Herzegovina

Banja Luka
Radio stations established in 2018

Mass media in Banja Luka